William Lindsay Orr (born June 12, 1948) is a Canadian former professional ice hockey defenceman.

During the 1973–74 season, Orr played 46 games in the World Hockey Association with the Toronto Toros.

References

External links

1948 births
Broome Dusters players
Canadian ice hockey defencemen
Ice hockey people from Ontario
Jacksonville Barons players
Kitchener Rangers players
Living people
New Haven Blades players
Roanoke Valley Rebels (SHL) players
Rochester Americans players
Sportspeople from Timmins
Syracuse Blazers players
Syracuse Eagles players
Toronto Toros players